Abu ol Kheyr (also Romanized as Abū ol Kheyr and Abowlkheyr; also known as Abolkheyr) is a village in Rudasht-e Sharqi Rural District, Bon Rud District, Isfahan County, Isfahan Province, Iran. At the 2006 census, its population was 301, in 83 families.

References 

Populated places in Isfahan County